Bal Dattatreya Tilak (26 September 1918 – 25 May 1999) was an Indian chemical engineer and a director of the National Chemical Laboratory.

He was awarded the Padma Bhushan, the third-highest civilian honour of the Government of India, in 1972.

References

1918 births
1999 deaths
Marathi people
Institute of Chemical Technology alumni
Recipients of the Padma Bhushan in science & engineering
20th-century Indian chemists
People from Wardha district
Scientists from Maharashtra
Indian chemical engineers